The La Ribera Hotel, also known as the Cypress Inn, is a historic Spanish Eclectic hotel in Carmel-by-the-Sea, California. It was designed by architects Blaine & Olsen of Oakland, California and built in 1929, by Meese & Briggs. The building was designated as a significant commercial building in the city's Downtown Historic District Property Survey, and was recorded with the Department of Parks and Recreation on February 13, 2003.

History

La Ribera Hotel has its origins in a home; watercolorist Sydney J. Yard designed and built his house on Lincoln Street and 7th Avenue in 1906. He later added an art studio, where he had regular showings. When Yard died in 1909, artist Mary DeNeale Morgan purchased Yard's house and studio, which later became the courtyard suite addition to the Cypress Inn in 2001.

The current building is a two-story reinforced concrete and wood frame  Spanish Eclectic style hotel. It is located on Lincoln Street & 7th Avenue. La Ribera means "The Riverbank " in Spanish. A tall stepped Moorish style tower is centered in the hotel with paired, keyhole arched opening on each elevation. A one-story hypen connects the main building with a two-story addition. A grass patio separates the two wings, enclosed by a wrought iron fence along 7th Avenue. It qualified for inclusion in the Downtown Historic District Property Survey because it is an example of the Spanish Eclectic commercial designed by the architects Blaine & Olsen of Oakland, California, and the 1949 two-story addition by San Francisco architect Gardner Dailey.

The hotel officially opened on July 3, 1929. The Carmel Pine Cone announced the opening of the dining room open for breakfast, lunch and dinner. At its opening, The Monterey County Herald called the La Ribera “One of the show places of the Monterey peninsula.”

The hotel was built two years after Blaine & Olsen completed the Kocher Building (1927), and one year after El Paseo Building (1928). The building was designed to complement the Kocher and El Paseo buildings in the Spanish Eclectic style. Dr. Rudoph Kocher found funding for the project through his associate, Grace Deere Veile (of the John Deere Family). Mrs. John S. Ball, who operated the Lincoln Inn, on the former site prior to construction, continued as manager of the La Ribera. The Meese & Briggs construction firm, from Burlingame, California, built the hotel.

During the Great Depression in the United States, the hotel went into receivership in 1930. It was reopened and managed as the La Ribera by A. G. Wood, a former manager of Monterey's San Carlos Hotel. In 1949, a two-story addition was made by San Francisco architect Gardner Dailey.

La Ribera kept its original name until the 1960s, when Earl E. McInnis took over management and renamed it the Cypress West hotel. In the mid-1980s, businessman Denny LeVett and actress Doris Day restored the hotel and reopened it as the Cypress Inn. It was an early pet–friendly hotel that was featured on March 15, 1999, in the Architectural Digest.

See also
List of hotels in the United States

References

External links

 Downtown Conservation District Historic Property Survey
 Historical Context Statement Carmel-by-the-Sea

1929 establishments in California
Carmel-by-the-Sea, California
Buildings and structures in Monterey County, California
Spanish Colonial Revival architecture in California